Kraken Mare  is the largest known body of liquid on the surface of Saturn's moon Titan. It was discovered by the space probe Cassini in 2006, and was named in 2008 after the Kraken, a legendary sea monster. It covers an area slightly bigger than the Caspian Sea on Earth, making it the largest known lake in the Solar System.

Description
At 500,000 km2, Kraken Mare is thought to be the largest body of liquid on Titan. It lies in the moon's northern polar region. Its status as a sea of hydrocarbons (mainly liquid methane) was identified by radar imagery. Kraken Mare is thought to be larger than the Caspian Sea on Earth. Analyses of the Cassini radar altimeter data used as a sounder have shown that the main body of Kraken Mare is at least 100 m deep and likely deeper than 300 m. One of its northernmost bays (Moray Sinus) has a depth of 85 (−18, +28) m at its center and shows an attenuation of the signal in the liquid that is compatible with a composition of 70% methane, 16% nitrogen and 14% ethane (assuming ideal mixing). Shallow capillary waves 1.5 centimeters high moving at 0.7 meters per second have been detected on the surface of Kraken Mare.

An island in the sea is named Mayda Insula. Kraken Mare may be hydrologically connected to the second-largest sea on Titan, Ligeia Mare. This connection has been suggested for the difference in sea composition, as certain compounds flow into Kraken Mare from Ligeia Mare. In addition, Kraken Mare has a lower methane concentration than Ligeia Mare.

The narrow constriction in the sea at 317°W, 67°N, about 17 km wide and similar in size to the Strait of Gibraltar, officially named Seldon Fretum, has been termed the 'Throat of Kraken' and suggested to be a location of significant currents. Titan's orbital eccentricity may lead to tides of 1 m in Kraken Mare, generating currents here of 0.5 m/s and possibly whirlpools. Other calculations estimate tides as high as 5 meters.

Changing features known as "Magic Islands" are observed in Kraken Mare. These features, which are further indication of an active hydrocarbon cycle on Titan, are possibly rising bubbles due to nitrogen exsolution.

Observation and exploration 
Kraken Mare, along with other Lakes of Titan, was first discovered by the Cassini–Huygens space probe on July 22, 2006. This was accomplished by noticing that certain dark regions, especially near the poles, had low radar reflectivity, as well as similar morphological features to that of terrestrial lakes. Many observations since have confirmed these findings. In addition to the radar images, the Cassini instrument VIMS (Visible and Infrared Mapping Spectrometer) has surveyed Kraken Mare and its surroundings.

There have been multiple proposals and ideas to explore the depths of Kraken Mare via probes and submarines. One such submarine has gone through a phase one NASA study, complete with submarine design and schematics. Another proposal, the Titan Mare Explorer was a finalist to explore the lake Ligeia Mare, with Kraken Mare as the secondary target, but InSight, a Mars lander, was accepted instead. The Titan Mare Explorer was also suggested to be included on the unprogressed Titan Saturn System Mission.

While a mission to Titan has been approved, the drone Dragonfly, there are no current missions to explore Kraken Mare or other lakes on Titan.

Gallery

See also

List of geological features on Titan

Notes

References

External links

Labelled map of Titan's north polar region, based on radar imagery, showing lakes and seas

Lakes of Titan (moon)